Hidden children during the Holocaust were the (mainly Jewish) children who were hidden in various different ways during the Holocaust, in order to save them from the Nazis. Most were hidden in Poland, though some were hidden in Western Europe. Not all attempts to save them were successful; for instance, Anne Frank was eventually captured in Amsterdam.

Methods of hiding
Most of the Hidden children during the Holocaust were hidden in Poland, though some were also hidden in Holland and France, with some children in other parts of Western Europe. Hidden children during the Holocaust were hidden in several different ways, each way being traumatic, but those where the child was separated from his or her parents were even more traumatic (and see next section).
A Hidden child during the Holocaust who was actually hidden with at least one of his parents, in some physical location, such as a secret attic.  The family would need at least one outside non-Jewish "helper," who brought in daily food and other supplies.  The lives of the helpers were in extreme danger if the Nazis were to find out this deception, since then they themselves would all be murdered.
A Hidden child during the Holocaust who was "hidden" in plain sight in a convent, as if one of the other regular Catholic children.  The child would have to be able to behave as all the other Catholic convent children behaved – know their prayers, know how to handle a rosary, know how to behave during mass, etc. All these skills the child would have to learn very quickly. In this case, at least one of the nuns, and generally more, would have to know that the child was actually Jewish and "hiding".  Once again, the lives of the nuns were in extreme danger if the Nazis were to find out this deception.
A Hidden child during the Holocaust who was "hidden" in plain sight and was placed into the care of a "foster-family," usually Catholic, and raised as if one of the family. To explain the sudden "arrival" of this "new" child into the family, he might for instance be described as a cousin who had come to join this family, perhaps from the countryside.  Since he was now a new member of this Catholic family, he too would have to be able to behave as other Catholic children behaved – know the prayers, know how to handle a rosary, know how to behave during mass, etc. Once again, the lives of the true family-members were in extreme danger if the Nazis were to find out this deception.
Some such "foster-family" children were only babies at the time they were "placed" with a foster-family, others only toddlers or else still very young.
The experience of these "foster family" hidden children was very similar to that of the One Thousand Children.
A Hidden child during the Holocaust who was "hidden" in plain sight by the Œuvre de Secours aux Enfants (OSE) as part of their continuing activities in France. (During the war, OSE was unable to continue its earlier work in Poland and elsewhere.)

In each of these cases, there had to be at least one non-Jewish, probably Catholic, helper on the outside, who risked their own life to help. Remembrance and records about such a person would often lead Yad Vashem, the Holocaust Remembrance Museum in Israel, to designate and honor them as  "Righteous among the Nations" (this is often mis-stated as "Righteous Gentile").

Trauma
Hidden children during the Holocaust faced significant trauma during and after World War II.

Most importantly, except when the Hidden child during the Holocaust was in hiding with at least one parent, the hidden child had "lost" his parents and his parental support during the war. Instead he went into the care, good or bad, of strangers.

Younger Hidden children during the Holocaust were often too young to remember their parents. None-the-less, they did suffer the extreme trauma of separation from their parents and being placed with previously unknown "foster-parents." While they did not remember this trauma consciously, it remained in their subconscious and in most cases had an impact on their future life behavior.

Older Hidden children during the Holocaust knew that if they were discovered by the Nazis their fate was definitely dire, and included possible death. This caused extreme stress and trauma at that time, and that trauma continued after the Holocaust and perhaps even into adulthood.

After the war, as with nearly all child survivors of the Holocaust, the Hidden child nearly certainly never regained his parents, who nearly certainly had been murdered by the Nazis.  Usually after some difficult delay, generally he would be truly adopted by a caring new family - but the trauma just mentioned would remain with him.

A notable source-book on Hidden children during the Holocaust is a book of excerpts of writings by themselves "Out of Chaos: Hidden Children Remember the Holocaust".

Recognition and restitution by German government
In 2014, the German government, through the Claims Conference, officially arranged to make an extra restitution payment of 2,500 Euros to each such Hidden child during the Holocaust, in addition to any other restitution for Holocaust experiences to which they were entitled. This was in recognition that any physical or emotional trauma suffered by a child would be greater than that suffered by an adult in similar circumstances, because the child would not yet have developed fully mature coping skills. Due to budgetary constraints, the amount of the payment (about $3,300 at the time) is only a small token, but with high symbolic value.

Documentary

A 2002 documentary, Secret Lives: Hidden Children and Their Rescuers During WWII, covered the hidden children.

References

External links
 Much information, including individual stories and items of memoribilia, can be found in this very useful web-page: Hidden Children: Hardships, at the United States Holocaust Memorial Museum

Children in the Holocaust